California is a unique place that has not always been well understood.  For hundreds of years there persisted a European misconception that California was an island and many maps were made depicting it as such.  Eventually, by the 18th century, enough information about California reached the outside world to dispel that myth.  As California became increasingly populated, comprehensive surveying and mapping of its territory seemingly expanded slowly.
When gold was discovered in 1848 and it joined the United States as the thirty first state in 1851 and interest in plotting California's landscapes boomed.

California quickly became a well-documented piece of the United States.  Time has brought even more mapping; with modern technology, particularly GIS any aspect of California can be and is recorded on a map.  Not only are physical maps of California readily available, but maps with all variety of demographic information are as well.

History

Chronology of early surveying and mapping efforts 

In 1841 Cadwalader Ringgold, an officer in the United States Navy, spent twenty days surveying the San Francisco Bay watershed as a member of the United States Exploring Expedition In 1849, Cadwalader Ringgold began a more comprehensive survey of surveying the San Francisco Bay region, the Sacramento River, and parts of the American and created a number of 8maps which included Depth sounding information for the Sacramento River and San Francisco Bay.  Also included on the maps are the sizes and locations of settlements along the Sacramento River.
A Series of Charts with Sailing Directions, by Cadwalader Ringgold was published in 1852.  This book includes the maps from the 1849 expedition as well as a color illustrations of ports and important landmarks.  To further supplement the navigators the book includes notes on observed magnetic variation and a table of 26 coordinates for landmarks, harbors and a table of bearings for several point to point journeys.

1857, the commanding officer of the United States Coast Survey Steamer, Active, discovers a deep submarine valley, or "gulch," in the center of Monterey Bay.  This is the first known sea-floor canyon and is now called Monterey Canyon.

From the 1850s through the 1860s, the United States Coast Survey, now NOAA's Office of Coast Survey, published a set of color maps with five stratigraphic units detailing the geologic makeup of California as well as a comprehensive set of nautical charts for the entire coast of California.

Shortly after statehood, the California state government appointed its first State Geologist and began commissioning geologic surveys of their own.  The state appointed John B. Trask to the position of State Geologist and he served from 1850 to 1856.  He compiled a report entitled "On the Geology of the Sierra Nevada, or California Range."
The second State Geologist, Josiah Whitney, served from 1860 to 1873.  Whitney organized the first comprehensive survey of California and the first complete topographic maps of the state were completed under him.  Mount Whitney, the tallest peak in California is named after him, a testament to his legacy.
The State Mining Bureau was established in 1880, and the position of State Geologist was changed to State Mineralogist.  In 1891, the first state geologic map showing eight color stratigraphic regions was published. The second geologic map of the state was published in 1916 and shows twenty one stratigraphic regions.
The State Mining Bureau was renamed the Division of Mines and Geology in 1862.  Its pseudonym, the California Geologic Survey, was established in January 2002.

In 1869, George Davidson, an assistant coast surveyor compiled the book, Pacific Coast: Coast Pilot of California, Oregon, and Washington Territory.  The 262 page volume is complete with illustrations, coordinate tables, notes on magnetic variation and some bathymetric sounding information.

Modern projects

Surveying efforts of California continue today with the assistance of modern technology.
Modern mapping in California involves the use of modern electronics to refine information found through analog methods.  Many organizations and government agencies are involved in collecting and mapping data in California today.

See also
Territorial evolution of California
Island of California
Bathymetry
Depth sounding

Mapping legislation 

Alquist Priolo Special Studies Zone Act
Surface Mining Control and Reclamation Act of 1977 (SMCRA)
Seismic Hazards Mapping Act

References

External links

Mapping projects in California

Federal government agencies mapping projects in California 

United States Geological Survey (USGS)
National Oceanographic and Atmospheric Administration.
United States Department of Agriculture.
Web Soil Survey

State government agencies mapping projects in California

California Department of Fish and Game
California Department of Fish and Game Biogeographic Data Branch
California Bureau of Land Management
California Geological Survey

Non-government organizations mapping projects in California

California Coastal Records Project - A photographic survey of the California Coastline, free to use. See Wikipedia article: California Coastal Records Project.

Bathymetric Data of the California Coast 
 USGS CMG Infobank Atlas: California Bathymetry

General California Map Links

Humboldt State University Library California Maps
NOAA Office of Coast Survey Historical Map and Chart Project
The University of Alabama Map Collection

Images of California 

NOAA Photo Library

Map Collections
David Rumsey Map Collection
Perry–Castañeda Library Map Collection

Pre-statehood history of California